Double Rainbow: The Music of Antonio Carlos Jobim is a 1995 album by jazz saxophonist Joe Henderson,  released on Verve Records.   It contains Henderson's rearrangement of music by Brazilian composer Antonio Carlos Jobim.

The album was originally intended to be a collaboration between Henderson and Jobim, but the plan was changed following Jobim's death. Musicians include pianists Eliane Elias and Herbie Hancock, bassist Christian McBride and drummer Jack DeJohnette.

Like his previous two albums for Verve Records, Double Rainbow received excellent reviews and relatively good sales for a jazz album in 1995.   Reviewer Scott Yanow called the album "very accessible yet unpredictable". The Penguin Guide to Jazz on CD awarded the album three stars and described it as "essentially high-calibre light-jazz".

Track listing
All compositions by Antonio Carlos Jobim.

 "Felicidade" – 4:45
 "Dreamer" – 5:24
 "Boto" – 6:35
 "Ligia" – 4:31
 "Once I Loved" – 5:22
 "Triste" – 5:28
 "Photograph" – 5:01
 "Portrait in Black and White (A.K.A. Zingaro)" – 5:17
 "No More Blues" – 6:39
 "Happy Madness" – 3:12 
 "Passarim" – 5:38
 "Modinha" – 4:33

Personnel
Joe Henderson – tenor saxophone
Eliane Elias – piano (tracks 1-4)
Herbie Hancock – piano (tracks 6-11)
Oscar Castro-Neves – guitar (tracks 1, 2, 5) 
Nico Assumpção – bass (tracks 1-4)
Christian McBride – bass (tracks 6-9, 11, 12)
Paulo Braga – drums (tracks 1-4)
Jack DeJohnette – drums (tracks 6-7, 9, 11)

References

1995 albums
Joe Henderson albums
Verve Records albums
Antônio Carlos Jobim tribute albums